Abigail P. W. Barrows (born 1984) is an American marine research scientist and advocate based in Maine. Barrows directs microplastics research that is used to inform conservation-focused legislation, and she initiated the first baseline data map of microplastic pollution distribution in the waters off the coast of Maine.

Early life and education
Barrows grew up in Stonington, Maine, a town on the island of Deer Isle, off the coast of Maine.  

Barrows graduated in 2006 with a bachelor's degree in zoology with a focus on marine biology from the University of Tasmania, Australia. After returning to Stonington, Maine, Barrows completed her master's degree in microplastics from the College of the Atlantic in Bar Harbor, Maine in 2018.

Life and career
Barrows studies plastic pollution in global waterways. Barrows' biological studies led her to travel much of the world including Papua New Guinea, the Himalaya, and South and Central America. She later focused her studies on microplastics, having recognized plastic pollution as a global issue.

Barrows directed global microplastic pollution research from 2013–2017, and consequently published research in collaboration with the Shaw Institute. She has published 12 scientific papers and her work on microplastic prevalence has been cited hundreds of times. Burrows worked with Adventure Scientists, an organization that links researchers with outdoorsmen and women. This collaboration yielded the largest known and most diverse microplastics dataset as of 2019.

Barrows leveraged her research to help pass legislation to reduce plastic consumption.

You can find and contact Abigail barrows at

References

External links

Abigail Barrows MPhil ’18 is at the Center of Worldwide Microfiber Study
Stonington scientist warns of microplastics in the ocean

American women biologists
1984 births
Living people
People from Stonington, Maine
Scientists from Maine
21st-century American women scientists
University of Tasmania alumni
College of the Atlantic alumni
American expatriates in Australia
American marine biologists
Women marine biologists